The judiciary of Colombia is a branch of the State of Colombia that interprets and applies the laws of Colombia, to ensure equal justice under law, and to provide a mechanism for dispute resolution. The judiciary comprises a hierarchical system of courts presided over by judges, magistrates and other adjudicators.

Colombia is a centralized state, thus there is only one jurisdiction (with the exception of special indigenous jurisdictions), which is functionally divided by subject matter into an ordinary, penal, administrative, disciplinary, constitutional and special jurisdictions (military, peace, and indigenous matters).

The judiciary of Colombia, unlike most jurisdictions, does not have a single supreme entity to oversee the lower courts, but rather has four high courts, known in Colombia as the "High Courts", which are the supreme tribunals of decision in their respective fields. The four high courts are the Constitutional Court (head of the constitutional jurisdiction), the Supreme Court (head of the ordinary jurisdiction), the Council of State (head of the administrative jurisdiction), and the Superior Council of Judicature (head of the disciplinary jurisdiction).  Though the courts are supposed to be equal, the Constitutional Court has a broad spectrum of judicial oversight which often allows it to rule on issues overseen by different jurisdictions and even to weigh in directly in the rulings of other high courts.

High Courts

Constitutional Court

The Colombian Constitutional court is in charge of guarding the Colombian Constitution. The Constitutional court also oversees the Tutela (similar to an Amparo) which protect individuals against violations  of fundamental rights as stated in the Article 86 of the Colombian Constitution. The Tutela can be filed against individuals, companies, the government itself and even judicial rulings. Thus the court can overturn rulings issued by other High Courts if it judges them to violate fundamental human rights.

The Colombian Constitutional court also decides on the constitutionality of Laws, Presidential Decree deemed to have force of law and International Treaties. Unlike the constitutional oversight of the Supreme Court of the United States, laws might be challenged at any time by any citizen and are not decided in a case by case basis but are directly decided upon on abstract. In other words, the plaintiff does not have to demonstrate he has been harmed by the law or that he has any legitimate interest on the decision, all he has to do is to allege why he considers the law to be unconstitutional even if the consequences of said unconstitutionality have not yet been realized or are merely implicit. The mechanism by which the court hears unconstitutionally cases is the Public Action of Unconstitutionality which dates back to 1910.

Supreme Court

The Supreme Court is the highest judicial instance of the ordinary jurisdiction. It consists of 23 judges which are chosen by coöption. The current magistrates  fill themselves any vacants by choosing from  a lists of ten candidates that are forwarded by the Council of Judicial Governance. This lists are integrated by the winners of public convocations that grade applicants by their merit.

The Court is formed by 3 chambers, a civil-agrarian chamber made up by 7 judges, a labor chamber made up by 7 judges and a Penal chamber made up by 9 judges. The Court is located in Bogotá.

Council of State of Colombia

The highest body of the Contentious Administrative Jurisdiction, it solves the processes that involve to the State and the matters, or the processes that involve to two State Entities ultimately; it also completes an advisory function because it is the body to which the Government should appeal before making certain decisions, it is not bound by its decision, but must consider the councils, verdict or opinion in certain matters.

The Council knows of the unconstitutionality of any norm that the Constitutional Court is not competent to adjudicate, which are all other norms that do not have material force of law, such as Reglementary Presidential Decrees, Administrative Acts, City Ordinances, etc.

Superior Council of the Judiciary 

Council of Government Judiciary serves for the administration of the branch and also has the power to decide over conflicts of competence between courts.

It is the highest disciplinary body of the judicial branch and serves as an Ethics Tribunal for Judges and lawyers alike.

Lower Courts

Ordinary Superior tribunals

The ordinary jurisdiction is divided into judicial districts  which function as appellate courts (Superior tribunals). Each district has a superior court, which hears appeals from and supervise the lower courts in the district. The court is composed of three judges which are appointed by the Supreme Court.
Criminal trials make use of an eight hundred .

Superior Tribunal of Antioquia
Superior Tribunal of Arauca
Superior Tribunal of Armenia
Superior Tribunal of Barranquilla
Superior Tribunal of Bogotá
Superior Tribunal of Bucaramanga
Superior Tribunal of Buga
Superior Tribunal of Caldas
Superior Tribunal of Cali
Superior Tribunal of Cartagena
Superior Tribunal of Cundinamarca
Superior Tribunal of Córdoba
Superior Tribunal of Cúcuta
Superior Tribunal of Florencia
Superior Tribunal of Ibagué
Superior Tribunal of Manizales
Superior Tribunal of Medellín
Superior Tribunal of Montería
Superior Tribunal of Neiva
Superior Tribunal of Pasto
Superior Tribunal of Pereira
Superior Tribunal of Popayán
Superior Tribunal of Quibdó
Superior Tribunal of Riohacha
Superior Tribunal of Risaralda
Superior Tribunal of San Andrés
Superior Tribunal of San Gil
Superior Tribunal of Santa Marta
Superior Tribunal of Sincelejo
Superior Tribunal of Tunja
Superior Tribunal of Valledupar
Superior Tribunal of Villavicencio
Superior Tribunal of Yopal

Regional courts

2nd Civil Court of the Circuit of Soacha
4th Civil Court of the Circuit of Bogotá
Civil Court of the Circuit of Granada, Meta
Civil Court of the Circuit of Cali
Civil Court of the Circuit of Cáqueza
Civil Court of the Circuit of Funza
Civil Court of the Circuit of Fusagasugá
Civil Court of the Circuit of Gachetá
Civil Court of the Circuit of La Ceja
Civil Court of the Circuit of Plato
Penal Court of the Circuit of Aguadas
Penal Court of the Circuit of Barranquilla
Penal Court of the Circuit of Cali
Penal Court of the Circuit of Fredonia
Penal Court of the Circuit of Guateque
Penal Court of the Circuit of Leticia
Penal Court of the Circuit of Manizales
Penal Court of the Circuit of Medellín
Penal Court of the Circuit of Mocoa
Penal Court of the Circuit of Bogotá
Penal Court of the Circuit of Santuario
Penal Court of the Circuit of Sogamoso
Penal Court of the Circuit of Villeta
Promiscuous Court of the Circuit of Guaduas

First Instance Courts

 Civil Municipal Courts of Colombia

Administrative Courts

The Administrative Courts of Colombia are a first instance level in the judiciary of the country. Administrative court are in the following departments.

Administrative Court of Cundinamarca
Administrative Courts of Antioquia
Administrative Courts of Arauca
Administrative Courts of Bolívar
Administrative Courts of Boyacá
Administrative Courts of Córdoba
Administrative Tribunal of Nariño
Administrative Tribunal of Risaralda
Administrative Tribunal of Santander
Administrative Tribunal of Atlántico
Administrative Tribunal of Caquetá
Administrative Tribunal of del Cauca
Administrative Tribunal of del Cesar
Administrative Tribunal of del Huila
Administrative Tribunal of Meta
Administrative Tribunal of Tolima
Administrative Tribunal of Valle del Cauca

Military Courts

Superior Military Tribunal

Jurisprudence

Jurisprudence (Case Law)
Jurisprudence (All Colombian Law)
Judiciary (In General)

References

External links

References 

 
Government of Colombia